Hua Shifei (born April 1947) is a Chinese military officer and politician who served as commander of Xinjiang Production and Construction Corps from 2005 to 2011.

Biography
Hua was born in Nanhui County (now Nanhui District) of Shanghai, in April 1947. He enlisted in the People's Liberation Army in June 1964, and joined the Chinese Communist Party (CCP) in December 1970. He served in the 10th Division of the Xinjiang Production and Construction Corps for a long time. He was appointed commander of Xinjiang Production and Construction Corps in March 2005 and was admitted to member of the standing committee of the CCP Xinjiang Uygur Autonomous Regional Committee, the region's top authority. In February 2012, he became vice chairperson of the Ethnic and Religious Affairs Committee of the Chinese People's Political Consultative Conference, serving in the post until his retirement in March 2018. He was a member of the 11th National Committee of the Chinese People's Political Consultative Conference.

References

1968 births
Living people
People's Republic of China politicians from Shanghai
Chinese Communist Party politicians from Shanghai
Members of the 11th Chinese People's Political Consultative Conference